Discontented Husbands is a 1924 American silent drama film directed by Edward LeSaint and written by Evelyn Campbell that was released by Columbia Pictures. The film stars James Kirkwood, Cleo Madison, and Grace Darmond. The film was released on January 15, 1924.

Plot
As described in a film magazine review, Michael Frazer, who has made several million dollars through the invention of a patent can opener, aspires to rise in society. However, his wife Jane is old fashioned and does not wish to make this climb. During a dinner party Jane keeps calling her husband "Mike" to his annoyance and lowers the chance of any social ambition when she refers to the cost of a table cover. Michael plans to have his estate transformed into a beauty garden and seeks bids for the work. Emily Ballard, whose husband Jack is a landscape artist, strikes up a friendship with Michael in order to secure the work for her husband. The friendship ripens and they make plans to run away together. Jack learns of this and, to teach Michael a lesson, plans to run off with their daughter Marcia. An automobile wreck where the machine rolls down an embankment and lands upside down spoils all plans and the families are reunited.

Cast

Preservation
With no prints of Discontented Husbands located in any film archives, it is now considered to be a lost film.

References

External links

1924 drama films
1924 films
Silent American drama films
American silent feature films
American black-and-white films
Columbia Pictures films
Lost American films
1924 lost films
Lost drama films
Films directed by Edward LeSaint
1920s American films